From The Darkness Into The Light is the third studio album by American rapper Mellow Man Ace. It was released on July 18, 2000, via X-Ray Records. The twelve-track record featured guest appearances by Cypress Hill and Profound.

Overview
Mellow Man Ace scored a major crossover hit with 1989's "Mentirosa" but, by 1993, the Havana-born rapper was without a record deal. Released in 2000, From the Darkness Into the Light was his first album since 1992's The Brother With Two Tongues. Eight years is a long time for an MC to go without a new album—especially when you consider how much hip-hop trends can change from one year to the next. But Ace, who was 33 when this CD came out, has no problem changing with the times and delivering an excellent album that is mindful of 2000's rap tastes. A revitalized Ace divides the disc into a Dark Side and a Light Side, which might lead one to assume that he is dividing his time between hardcore rap and pop-rap like he did in the past. But that isn't the case. 

Enlisting such producers as DJ Muggs (of Cypress Hill and 7A3 fame) and Tony G., Ace avoids pop-rap—this release doesn't offer anything as commercial as "Mentirosa"—and sticks to hardcore rap. Truth be told, the Dark Side and Light Side are equally hard-hitting. The album has a consistently serious tone; Ace tackles a lot of social issues (everything from urban violence to child pornography), and he speaks candidly and openly about the fact that he went from fame to obscurity. Regrettably, From the Darkness Into the Light wasn't the major commercial comeback he was no doubt hoping for—the album received very little attention. But that doesn't make it any less compelling.

Track listing

Personnel 
 Bruce Gowdy  - recording, engineering, mixing
 Chuck Wright - artwork
 Kevin Smith - engineering
 Marco Torres - photography
 Mike Mireau - mastering
 Lawrence Muggered - production, recording, mixing
 Ulpiano Sergio Reyes - main artist, production

References

2000 albums
Mellow Man Ace albums